CGP-37849 is a competitive antagonist at the NMDA receptor. It is a potent, orally active anticonvulsant in animal models, and was researched for the treatment of epilepsy. It also has neuroprotective activity and shows antidepressant and anxiolytic effects.

References 

NMDA receptor antagonists
Phosphonic acids
Amino acids
Alkene derivatives